Don't Stop Believin' (simplified Chinese: 我们等你!) is a Singaporean Chinese drama which was telecast on Singapore's free-to-air channel, MediaCorp Channel 8. It made its debut on 14 August 2012. This drama serial consists of 20 episodes and was screened on weekdays at 9:00 pm. It stars Felicia Chin, Elvin Ng, Romeo Tan, Edwin Goh, Kimberly Chia, Ian Fang & Xu Bin as the casts of this series.

Plot
Du Siman (Felicia Chin) is a passionate teacher of a top school. After clashing with the principal over a student, she decides to join Brilliante Secondary School, the school with the worst academic results in Singapore as it accepts pupils who have failed the Primary School Leaving Examinations at least twice. Through sheer determination, she manages to convince the principal, Zhou Yaoguang (Cavin Soh) and vice principal Li Shengchun (Constance Song), to recruit her. Unfortunately, Siman's first day at the school turns out disastrous.

Wu Yanbin (Elvin Ng) is a counselor in the school. Initially, Siman was furious with Yanbin after he did not respond to her calls for help when she was locked inside a recreation room. He even seemingly rejects Siman's profession of love for him. However, her stance towards him softened after she found out that Yanbin suffers from frequent bouts of sudden deafness.

In Siman's class is a student by the name of Bai Zhixiang (Ian Fang). If not for a home visit, she will not have believed that in a prosperous First World country like Singapore, there exists such a poor family who not only cannot pay their utility bills, they do not even have gas at home. Then there is another student Cai Wensheng (Edwin Goh) who is studying, and working at the same time to support the family at such a tender age because his father, Tianshi (Wang Yuqing), is mentally unwell. Emotions well up when Siman and the new volunteer teacher Angel (Tang Ling Yi) see these students rushing off to work right after school.

Zhong Guo'an (Brandon Wong) is the disciplinary master of the school. In front of the whole school, he canes Junliang (Xu Bin) who is involved in a case where a female student, Jessie (Shelia Tan) is molested. Feeling maligned, the indignant Junliang throws a bag of urine at Jessie sneakily. Unfortunately, Guo'an slips and is rendered paralysed as a result. Full of guilt, Junliang wants to visit Guo'an in hospital but is stopped by Yaoguang. Out of guilt, he protests about not being allowed to see his own father.

Zhixiang has his first taste of love when he falls for a classmate, Yilin (Kimberly Chia), who rejects him. Yilin confides in Yanbin every now and then. Once, when Yilin suffers a nosebleed, Yanbin carefully helps her to stop the bleeding. The young girl somehow develops feelings for him despite knowing that Yanbin is in love with someone else...

Jin Zhengnan (Romeo Tan), Yanbin's good friend, is fond of Siman after meeting her for the time. To get close to her, he volunteers to conduct a bakery class for the students of Brilliante Secondary School. Siman's heart, however, is with Yanbin. Once, Siman sums up her courage to express her feelings for Yanbin. Unfortunately, Yanbin's hearing defect leads to Siman mistaking him for rejecting her love. Disappointed, Siman finally gives in to Zhengnan's wooing.

Siman and Yanbin take the students on an overseas tour. They find out unexpectedly that Yilin is suffering from a terminal illness. In fact, Yilin knows about it all along but chooses to hide the truth from her teachers and classmates. As her condition worsens, she is unable to participate in the culinary competition organized by the TV station. She can only hope that her teammates will fulfill her wish.

Alex (Xavier Ong), a problem student who bears a grudge against Yanbin for punishing him, threatens another student into accusing Yanbin of molestation. He even trumps up a load of evidence and produces false witnesses, leaving Yanbin defenceless. In view of the damning evidence, the school board unanimously decides to fire Yanbin. Yaoguang goes all out to defend Yanbin, and makes up his mind to pursue the matter with him. He vows to resign as Principal if Yanbin is dismissed from his job. Siman is roused to join their camp.

Cast

Teachers

Students

Parents / Other cast

Du Siman's Family

Cai Wensheng's Family

Deng Yilin's Family

Zhong Junliang's Family

Production
Filming for Don't Stop Believin started on 10 May 2012 and ended on 16 July 2012. The school scenes would be filmed at East Coast Primary School and the production studio. Out-of-studio filmed scenes included locations like NEX, City Square Mall, Punggol, Serangoon, Bishan and Sentosa.

Producer Soh Bee Lian said that there might be a sequel to Don't Stop Believin''', though this sequel would involve a new cast and would take some time to produce. The sequel may replace Unriddle 2 in having a third instalment.

ReceptionDon't Stop Believin was well received by Singaporean viewers. It was the most-watched television drama of 2012 in Singapore, garnering an average viewership of 919,000 over its 20 episodes. Although its debut episode garnered only 852,000 viewers, the drama's last episode was attracted a total of 1,047,800 viewers, beating the previous viewership record of 993,000 viewers set by the period drama Joys of Life.

A review in The Straits Times'' described this drama as "refreshing". It also praised "the energy of the young cast", who  "makes the drama more enjoyable than you expect it to be". However, it added that "At second sight, Channel 8 touches, such as repetitive lines and ideas, are more apparent". Overall, the newspaper gave this television drama a rating of 3 out of 5 stars.

Overseas broadcast
This drama is one of the first dramas to be broadcast exclusive in Malaysia after its first telecast of two weeks, but there are possible plans to broadcast worldwide.

Awards & Nominations

Star Awards 2013
Don't Stop Believin' clinched 4 out of 10 nominations in the Star Awards 2013, including Top Rated Drama Serial of the year. The other dramas nominated for Best Drama Series Poetic Justice, Unriddle 2, Game Plan & Pillow Talk. The other dramas that are nominated for Best Theme Song are It Takes Two, Joys of Life, Show Hand & Yours Fatefully.

PPCTV AWARDS

See also
 List of programmes broadcast by Mediacorp Channel 8
 List of Don't Stop Believin' episodes

References

External links
 ''Don't Stop Believin''' on Facebook

Singapore Chinese dramas
2012 Singaporean television series debuts
Channel 8 (Singapore) original programming